High Speed 1 (HS1), legally the Channel Tunnel Rail Link (CTRL), is a  high-speed railway linking London with the Channel Tunnel.

It is part of a line carrying international passenger traffic between the United Kingdom and mainland Europe; it also carries domestic passenger traffic to and from stations in Kent and east London, and continental European loading gauge freight traffic. From the Channel Tunnel, the line crosses the River Medway, and tunnels under the River Thames, terminating at London St Pancras International station on the north side of central London. It cost £5.8 billion to build and opened on 14 November 2007.

International passenger services are provided by Eurostar International, with journey times from London St Pancras International to Paris Gare du Nord in 2hours 15minutes, and London St Pancras International to Brussels South/Bruxelles-Midi/Brussel Zuid in 1hour and 51minutes. 
, Eurostar uses a fleet of 27 Class 373/1 multi-system trains capable of 300km/h and  Class 374 trains. Domestic high-speed commuter services serving the intermediate stations and beyond began on 13 December 2009. DB Cargo UK run freight services on High Speed 1 using adapted Class 92 locomotives, enabling flat wagons carrying continental-size swap body containers to reach London for the first time.

The CTRL project saw new bridges and tunnels built, with a combined length nearly as long as the Channel Tunnel itself, and significant archaeological research undertaken. In 2002, the CTRL project was awarded the Major Project Award at the British Construction Industry Awards. The line was transferred to government ownership in 2009, with a 30-year concession for its operation awarded to a consortium of Borealis Infrastructure (part of Ontario Municipal Employees Retirement System) and Ontario Teachers' Pension Plan in November 2010.

Early history 

A high-speed rail line, LGV Nord, has been in operation between the Channel Tunnel and the outskirts of Paris since the Tunnel's opening in 1994. A similar high-speed line in Belgium, from the French border to Brussels, HSL 1, opened in 1997. These tracks were shared with local traffic, limiting the number of services that could be run, and jeopardising reliability. The case for a high-speed line similar to the continental part of the route was recognised by policymakers, and the construction of the line was authorised by Parliament with the Channel Tunnel Rail Link Act 1996, which was amended by the Channel Tunnel Rail Link (Supplementary Provisions) Act 2008.

An early plan conceived by British Rail in the early 1970s for a route passing through Tonbridge met considerable opposition on environmental and social grounds, especially from the Leigh Action Group and Surrey & Kent Action on Rail (SKAR). A committee was set up to examine the proposal under Sir Alexander Cairncross; but in due course environment minister Anthony Crosland announced that the project had been cancelled, together with the plan for the tunnel itself.

The next plan for the Channel Tunnel Rail Link involved a tunnel reaching London from the south-east, and an underground terminus in the vicinity of London King's Cross station. A late change in the plans, principally driven by Deputy Prime Minister Michael Heseltine's desire for urban regeneration in East London, led to a change of route, with the new line approaching London from the east. This opened the possibility of reusing the underused St Pancras railway station as the terminus, with access via the North London Line that crosses the throat of the station.

The idea of using the North London line proved illusory, and it was rejected in 1994 by the then Transport Secretary, John MacGregor, as too difficult to construct and environmentally damaging.

London & Continental Railways (LCR) was chosen by the UK government in 1996 to build the line and to reconstruct St Pancras station as its terminus, and to take over the British share of the Eurostar operation, Eurostar (UK). The original LCR consortium members were National Express, Virgin Group, SG Warburg & Co, Bechtel and London Electric. While the project was under development by British Rail it was managed by Union Railways, which became a wholly owned subsidiary of LCR. On 14 November 2006, LCR adopted High Speed 1 as the brand name for the completed railway. Official legislation, documentation and line-side signage have continued to refer to "CTRL".

Project 
As the Channel Tunnel Act 1987 made government funding for a Channel Tunnel rail link unlawful, construction did not take place, as it was not financially viable. Construction was delayed until the passage of the Channel Tunnel Rail Link Act 1996, which provided construction powers that would run for ten years. The chief executive, Rob Holden, stated that it was the "largest land acquisition programme since the Second World War".

The whole route was to have been built as a single project, but in 1998, serious financial difficulties arose, and extensive changes came with a British government rescue plan. To reduce risk, the line was split into two separate phases, to be managed by Union Railways (South) and Union Railways (North). A recovery programme was agreed whereby LCR sold government-backed bonds worth £1.6 billion to pay for the construction of section 1, with the future of section 2 still not settled.

The original intention had been for the new railway, once completed, to be run by Union Railways as a separate line from the rest of the British railway network. As part of the 1998 rescue it was agreed that following completion, section 1 would be purchased by Railtrack with an option to purchase section 2. In return, Railtrack was committed to operate the whole route as well as London St Pancras International, which, unlike all other former British Rail stations, had been transferred to LCR/Union Railways in 1996.

In 2001, Railtrack announced that because of its own financial problems, it would not undertake to purchase section 2, triggering a second restructuring. The 2002 plan agreed that the two sections would have different owners (Railtrack for section 1, LCR for section 2) but with common Railtrack management. Following further financial problems at Railtrack, its interest was sold back to LCR, which then sold the operating rights for the completed line to Network Rail, Railtrack's successor. Under this arrangement LCR became the sole owner of both sections of the CTRL and the St Pancras property, as per the original 1996 plan. Amendments were made in 2001 for the new station at Stratford International and connections to the West Coast Main Line.

As a consequence of the restructuring, the LCR consortium in 2001 consisted of engineering consultants and construction firms Arup, Bechtel, Halcrow and Systra (which form Rail Link Engineering (RLE)); transport operators National Express and SNCF (which operates the Eurostar (UK) share of the Eurostar service with the National Railway Company of Belgium and British Airways), the electricity company EDF and UBS.

There were several deaths of employees working on the CTRL over the construction period. One occurred on 28 March 2003 near Folkestone when a worker came into contact with the energised power supply. Another death occurred two months later, in May 2003, when a scaffolder fell seven metres at Thurrock, Essex. Three companies were found guilty of breaching health and safety legislation by omitting to provide barriers, resulting in Deverson Direct Ltd. being ordered to pay a fine of £50,000, J.Murphy & Sons Ltd. £25,000, and Hochtief AG £25,000. Two more deaths resulted from a fire on board a train carrying wires, one mile inside a tunnel under the Thames between Swanscombe, Kent, and Thurrock, Essex on 16 August 2005. The train shunter died at the scene and the train driver later died in hospital. It has been suggested that a large amount of blame for accidents throughout the project lay with individual behaviour, becoming such a problem that an internal programme was launched to tackle problem behaviour during the construction.

On completion of section 1 by RLE, the line was handed over to Union Railways (South), which then handed it over to London & Continental Stations and Property (LCSP), the line's long-term owners. Once section 2 of the line had been completed, it was handed over to Union Railways (North), which handed it over to LCSP. The entire line, including St Pancras, is managed, operated and maintained by Network Rail (CTRL).

In February 2006, there were rumours that a 'third party' (believed to be a consortium headed by banker Sir Adrian Montague) had expressed an interest in buying out the present partners in the project. LCR shareholders rejected the proposal, and the government, which could effectively overrule shareholders' decisions as a result of LCR's reclassification as a state-owned body, decided that discussions with shareholders would not take place imminently, which effectively backed shareholders' views on the proposed takeover.

By May 2009, LCR had become insolvent, and the government received an agreement to use state aid to purchase the line and to open it up to competition to allow other services to use it apart from Eurostar. LCR's wholly owned subsidiary, HS1 Ltd, thus became the property of the Secretary of State for Transport. On 12 October 2009 a proposal was announced to sell £16 billion of state assets including HS1 Ltd in the following two years to cut UK public debt. The government announced on 5 November 2010 that a concession to operate the line for thirty years had been sold for £2.1 billion to a consortium of Canadian investors. Under the concession, HS1 Ltd has the rights to sell access to track and to the four international stations (St Pancras, Stratford, Ebbsfleet and Ashford) on a commercial basis, under the scrutiny of the Office of Rail & Road. At the end of thirty years, ownership of the assets will revert to the government.

Building cost 
The cost of construction was £6.84 billion. At £51 million per mile, this was higher than other projects in many other countries. The French LGV Est, a line built largely through near-flat fields (save for the Saverne Tunnel) and which terminates outside its urban centres (Vaires-sur-Marne for Paris and Vendenheim for Strasbourg) cost £22 million per mile. Its phase one was completed in 2007 and phase two in 2016.

Route 

The high-speed railway operates as a "seven-day railway", with full availability on all days.  Heavy maintenance is performed overnight.  
, track access charges were capped at approximate £71.35 per minute.  In 2008, the cost of running a train along the full length of the line between St Pancras and the Channel Tunnel was £2,244; with lower costs of £2,192 for a domestic service to Ashford International, or £1,044 for St Pancras to Ebbsfleet International.  A discounted rate of £4.00 per kilometre was made available for night-time-only railfreight operation until 31 March 2015.

Section 1 
Section 1 of the Channel Tunnel Rail Link, opened on 28 September 2003, is a  section of high-speed track from the Channel Tunnel to Fawkham Junction in north Kent with a maximum speed of 300km/h. Its completion cut the London–Paris journey time by around 21minutes, to 2hours 35minutes. Much of the new line runs alongside the M2 and M20 motorways through Kent. After its completion, Eurostar trains continued to use suburban lines to enter London, arriving at Waterloo International.

Unlike most LGV stations in France, the through tracks for Ashford International station are off to one side rather than going through, partly because the station pre-dates the line. High Speed 1 approaches Ashford International from the north in a cut-and-cover "box"; the southbound line rises out of this cutting and crosses over the main tracks to enter the station. The main tracks then rise out of the cutting and over a flyover. On leaving Ashford, southbound Eurostars return to the high-speed line by travelling under this flyover and joining from the outside.  The international platforms at Ashford are supplied with both overhead 25kVAC and third-rail 750VDC power, avoiding the need to switch power supplies.

Section 2 
Section 2 of the project opened on 14 November 2007, and is a  stretch of track from the newly built Ebbsfleet station in Kent to London St Pancras. Completion of the section cut journey times by a further 20minutes (London–Paris in 2hours 15minutes; London–Brussels in 1hour 51minutes). The route starts with a  tunnel which dives under the Thames on the edge of Swanscombe, then runs alongside the London, Tilbury and Southend line as far as Dagenham, where it enters a  tunnel, much of which is directly under the North London Line, before emerging over the East Coast Main Line near St Pancras. The tunnels are divided into London East and London West sections, between which a 1-kilometre stretch runs close to the surface to serve Stratford International and the Temple Mills Depot. The new depot, to the north of Stratford, replaced the North Pole depot in the west of London. In testing, the first Eurostar train ran into St Pancras on 6 March 2007. All CTRL connections are fully grade-separated.

Stations

Ashford International 

This station was rebuilt as Ashford International during the early 1990s for international services from mainland Europe; this included the addition of two platforms to the north of station (the original down island platform had been taken over by international services). Unlike normal LGV stations in France, the through tracks for Ashford International railway station are off to one side rather than going through. The number of services was reduced after the opening of the Ebbsfleet station. A high-speed domestic service operated by Southeastern to London St Pancras began on 29 June 2009.

Ebbsfleet International 

Ebbsfleet International railway station in the borough of Dartford, Kent is  outside the eastern boundary of Greater London and opened to the public on 19 November 2007. It is now Eurostar's main station in Kent. Two of the platforms are designed for international passenger trains and four for high-speed domestic services.

St Pancras International 

The terminus for the high-speed line in London is St Pancras railway station. During the 2000s, towards the end of the construction of the CTRL, the entire station complex was renovated, expanded and renamed as St Pancras International, with a new security-sealed terminal area for Eurostar trains to continental Europe. In addition, it retained traditional domestic connections to the north and south of England. The new extension doubled the length of the central platforms now used for Eurostar services; new platforms have been provided for existing domestic East Midlands Trains and the Southeastern high-speed services that run along High Speed 1 to Kent. New platforms on the Thameslink line across London were built beneath the western margins of the station, and the station at King's Cross Thameslink was closed.

A complex junction has been built north of St Pancras with connections to the East Coast Main Line, North London Line (for West Coast Main Line) and Midland Main Line, allowing for a wide variety of potential destinations albeit on conventional rails. As part of the works, tunnels connecting the East Coast Main Line to the Thameslink route were also built in readiness for the forthcoming Thameslink Programme.

Stratford International 

Stratford International railway station was not part of the original government plans for the CTRL. Despite its name, no international services call there.
Completed in April 2006, it opened on 30 November 2009 when the domestic preview Southeastern highspeed services started calling there. An extension of the Docklands Light Railway opened to Stratford International in August 2011. It forms part of the complex of railway stations for the main site where the 2012 Summer Olympics were held.

Temple Mills Depot in Leyton is used for storage and servicing of Eurostar trains and off-peak berthing of Class 395 Southeastern high-speed trains.

Infrastructure 

The railway is maintained from Singlewell Infrastructure Maintenance Depot.

The construction work of the line was complex, and many contractors were involved in delivering them. The CTRL Section 2 construction works had caused considerable disruption around the Kings Cross area of London; in their wake redevelopment was stimulated. The large redevelopment area includes the run-down areas of post-industrial and ex-railway land close to King's Cross and St Pancras, a conservation area with many listed buildings; this was promoted as one of the benefits for building the CTRL. It has been postulated that this development was actually suppressed by the construction project, and some affected districts were said still to be in a poor state in 2005.

Track 
Both track and signalling technology (TVM-430 + KVB) are based on or identical to the standards used on the French LGV high-speed lines. The areas around St Pancras and Gare du Nord use colour light and KVB signalling with the whole of the high-speed route to Paris (CTRL, Channel Tunnel, LGV Nord) using TVM-430.  Traffic between London and the Channel Tunnel is controlled from the Ashford signalling centre.  Signalling tests before opening were performed by the SNCF-owned "Lucie" test car.

The track is  cleared to a larger modern European GC loading gauge enabling GC gauge freight as far as the yards at Barking. The line is electrified entirely using overhead lines with 25 kV AC railway electrification.

Tunnels 
Previously the CTRL was planned to run on an elevated section alongside the North London Line on approach into the line's terminus. The twin tunnels bored under London were driven from Stratford westwards towards St Pancras, eastwards towards Dagenham and from Dagenham westwards to connect with the tunnel from Stratford.

Other major tunnels along the route include a 3.1 km tunnel underneath the River Thames at Thurrock in Essex and the 3.2 km North Downs Tunnel near Maidstone in Kent.

Viaducts 
The Medway Viaduct takes the line over the River Medway adjacent to the M2 motorway, the  Thurrock Viaduct takes the line over the A282 Dartford Crossing and the Ashford Viaduct takes the fast lines over Ashford International station.

Connection line to Waterloo 
A  connecting line providing access for Waterloo International leaves High Speed 1 at Southfleet Junction using a grade-separated junction; the main CTRL tracks continue uninterrupted through to CTRL Section 2 underneath the southbound flyover. The connection joins the Chatham Main Line at Fawkham Junction with a flat crossing. The retention of Eurostar services to Waterloo after the line to St Pancras opened was ruled out on cost grounds. Waterloo International closed upon opening of the section two of the CTRL in November 2007; Eurostar now serves the refurbished St Pancras as its only London terminal, so this connecting line is no longer used in regular service, but can be used by Class 395 passenger trains.

Services 
International passenger services on this line are operated by Eurostar, with maximum speed 300km/h, while domestic passenger services are operated by Southeastern as far as Ashford International, with maximum speed 225km/h.

High Speed 1 was built to allow eight trains per hour through to the Channel Tunnel. As of May 2014, Eurostar runs two to three trains per hour in each direction between London and the Channel Tunnel. Southeastern runs in the high peak eight trains per hour between London and Ebbsfleet, two of these continuing to Ashford. During the 2012 Olympic Games, Southeastern provided the Olympic Javelin service with up to twelve trains per hour from Stratford into London.

Freight 
The route was built with freight provision from the beginning. It has spurs leading to and from the freight terminal at Dollands Moor (Folkestone) and the freight depot at Barking (Ripple Lane), north of the River Thames. Long passing loops to hold freight trains while passenger trains overtake them were built at Lenham Heath and Singlewell.

Freight trains operated by EWS first ran over CTRL Section 1, on the consecutive evenings of 3–4 April 2004. Five freight trains that would have run via the classic lines were diverted to run over the Channel Tunnel Rail Link instead: three southbound intermodal trains on 3 April 2004 and two northbound intermodal trains on 4 April 2004.

Ownership 
In November 2010, the HS1 concession was awarded for a duration of thirty years to an investment consortium bringing together two Canadian public pension funds: Ontario Municipal Employees Retirement System (through its subsidiary Borealis Infrastructure), and Ontario Teachers' Pension Plan.
At the time, UK pension investors had generally limited interest in such long-term, illiquid, 'infrastructure assets'.

In 2017, the sale of HS1 was announced to funds advised and managed by InfraRed Capital Partners and Equitix Investment Management; participants include HICL Infrastructure and South Korea's National Pension Service.

The private operator does not hold the freehold or rights to any of the associated land.

Operators 

The railway is operated on an open access basis.  Trains are operated by several organisations all operating over the same track. HS1 Ltd. is the network manager for the line, stations, and other infrastructure.

Network Rail (High Speed) Ltd 

HS1 Ltd is responsible for overall managing and running of the line – along with the international railway stations at St Pancras, Stratford, Ashford and Ebbsfleet – with responsibility for the infrastructure itself sub-contracted to Network Rail (High Speed) Ltd (formerly known as Network Rail (CTRL) acting as the controller and infrastructure manager. Network Rail (CTRL) Limited was created as a subsidiary of Network Rail on 26 September 2003 for £57 million to take over the assets of the CTRL renewal and maintenance operations. Network Rail (High Speed) operates engineering, track maintenance machines, rescue locomotives, and infrastructure- and test trains.  Eurotunnel's subsidiary Europorte 2 operates its Eurotunnel Class 0001 (Krupp/MaK 6400) rescue locomotives on the line when required.

Various track recording trains run as necessary, including visits by the New Measurement Train. On the night of 4/5 May 2011 the SNCF TGV Iris 320 laboratory train took over, being hauled from Coquelles to St Pancras and back, towed by Eurotunnel Krupp locomotives numbers 4 and 5. The Iris 320 runs  for Network Rail (High Speed) are an extension of the  monitoring cycle already undertaken by SNCF International since December 2010 for Eurotunnel every two months.

Eurostar 

The Eurostar service uses about 40% of the capacity of High Speed 1, which in November 2007 became the company's route for all its services. Eurostar trains are for international traffic only, passing along the high-speed line from London St Pancras railway station to the Channel Tunnel, with the majority terminating at either Paris Gare du Nord in France or Brussels-South railway station in Belgium. Prior to the formation of Eurostar International Limited, the British component of the Eurostar grouping was owned by London & Continental Railways, which had also previously owned the High Speed 1 infrastructure.

The fastest regular-service Eurostar journeys on record are 2 hours, 3 minutes and 39 seconds from Paris Gare du Nord to St Pancras, set on 4 September 2007; and 1 hour 43 minutes from Brussels South to St Pancras, set on 19 September 2007.

Southeastern 

Domestic high-speed services on High Speed 1 are operated by Southeastern. Having been in planning since 2004, a preview service of the British Rail Class 395 trains, popularly known as Javelins, started in June 2009, and regular services began on 13 December 2009. The quickest journey time from Ashford to London St Pancras is 35 minutes, compared with 80 minutes for the service to London Charing Cross via Tonbridge. This service on Section 2 of the CTRL, known previously as CTRL-DS, was a factor in London's successful 2012 Olympic Bid, promising a seven-minute journey time from the Olympic Park at Stratford to the London terminus at St Pancras.

DB Cargo UK 

DB Cargo is a global freight operator with a large interest in freight over rail in Europe. While High Speed 1 was constructed with freight loops, no freight traffic had run upon the line since opening in 2003. On 16 April 2009 DB Schenker signed an agreement with HS1 Ltd, the owner of High Speed 1, for a partnership to develop TVM modifications for class 92 freight locomotives to run on the line. On 25 March 2011 for the first time a modified class 92 locomotive travelled from Dollands Moor to Singlewell using the TVM430 signalling system. A loaded container train ran for the first time on 27 May 2011, to Novara in Italy. Following further trials with loaded wagons DB is to upgrade five Class 92 locomotives to allow them to run on High Speed 1. From 11 November 2011 a weekly service using European-sized swap body containers has run between London and Poland using High Speed 1.

Future operations 
At present, only Deutsche Bahn (DB) has applied for use of the line and in 2009, regulations were relaxed to allow its trains to use the Channel Tunnel. Other proposals are yet to be formalised.

Deutsche Bahn 

In November 2007, it was reported that DB, Germany's national train company, had applied to use the Channel Tunnel and High Speed 1 into London. This was denied by Deutsche Bahn, and the bi-national Channel Tunnel Safety Authority confirmed that it had not received such an application. The plan was delayed by safety regulations as Deutsche Bahn's fleet of ICE 3M high-speed trains could not be divided in the tunnel in an emergency.

In December 2008, it was reported that DB was interested in buying the British share in Eurostar, which in practice means buying Eurostar (UK) Ltd., the 100% subsidiary of London & Continental Railways (LCR), which the British government intends to break up and sell just as it does the other rail-related subsidiary of L&CR, HS1 Ltd. The buyer of EUKL would become the owner of the 11 British "Three Capitals" Class 373 trainsets plus all seven "North of London" sets, and would also be responsible for the operations of Eurostar traffic within Britain once the management contract with ICRR expires in 2010. Guillaume Pépy, the president of SNCF, who held a press conference the same day, described DB's interest as "premature, presumptuous and arrogant".
SNCF claims to own 62% of the shares of Eurostar Group Ltd. Hartmut Mehdorn, then CEO of Deutsche Bahn, confirmed DB's interest but insisted in a letter to Pépy that DB had only informally requested information and not made any official requests to Britain's Department for Transport.

In 2009, Eurotunnel (the owners of the Channel Tunnel) announced that it was prepared to start relaxing the fire safety regulations, in order to permit other operators, such as Deutsche Bahn, to transport passengers via the Tunnel using other forms of rolling stock. Under the deregulation of European railway service, high-speed lines were opened up to access by other operators on 1 January 2010; the Inter-Governmental Commission on the Channel Tunnel (IGC) announced that it was considering relaxing the safety requirements concerning train splitting. LCR suggested that high-speed rail services between London and Cologne could commence before the 2012 Olympics.

In March 2010, Eurotunnel, HS1 Ltd, DB and other interested train operators formed a working group to discuss changes to the safety rules, including allowing 200-metre trains. The Intergovernmental Commission currently requires trains to be 400 m long. Deutsche Bahn carried out evacuation trials in the tunnel on 17 October 2010 with two 200m-long ICE3 trains, and displayed one of them at St Pancras station on 19 October. The current Velaro ICE3 sets do not meet the fire safety requirements for passenger services through the tunnel, but the Siemens Velaro D sets on order include the necessary additional fire-proofing. In March 2011, the European Rail Agency decided to allow trains with distributed traction to operate in the Channel Tunnel. DB is planning three services a day to Frankfurt (5h from London), Rotterdam (3h) and Amsterdam (4h) via Brussels from 2015. This had originally planned to be 2013, but has been delayed due to the availability of the Channel Tunnel version of the Siemens Velaro D trains, high rental costs of the French rail network and border controls in their stations. As of 2016, nothing yet has come to fruition, but the High Speed One website continues to state that "HS1 Ltd are working with Deutsche Bahn on plans to incorporate three additional international return journeys, between Frankfurt and London via Cologne, Brussels and Lille. This will include connections from Amsterdam via Rotterdam to London."

In March 2017, it was announced that Deutsche Bahn had revived plans for a London to Frankfurt train service with the service beginning as early as 2020. The service would take around five hours and could rival airlines and become the first competitor for Eurostar. However, in June 2018, Deutsche Bahn stated the plans have been shelved due to a "significantly changed economic environment".

Veolia 

In 2009, Veolia announced that it would begin working on new proposals in co-operation with Trenitalia to run services from Paris to Strasbourg, London and Brussels.

Renfe 

Spanish railway operator RENFE said in 2009 that it was interested in running AVE services from Spain to London via Paris, Lyon, Barcelona, Madrid and Lisbon (using the Madrid–Barcelona high-speed rail line) once its AVE network was connected to France via the Barcelona to Figueres and Perpignan to Figueres lines in 2012.

In October 2021, Renfe announced that It intends to operate high-speed trains between Paris and London using the Channel Tunnel and High Speed 1. A Renfe spokesperson has said that there are possible options available on the high-speed route for additional trains to operate. “According to the demand analyses carried out, it would be viable and profitable for Renfe to compete with Eurostar.” The rail company claims it had already received support from Getlink – the European company that operates the Channel tunnel – and from HS1, which owns, runs and maintains the 109km rail line between the Channel tunnel and London.

Getlink 
In August 2018, Bloomberg Businessweek reported that Getlink is interested in setting up an Ouigo-style low cost high speed rail service between London and Paris, travelling between the railway stations of Stratford International and Charles-de-Gaulle.

Services to Bordeaux 
It was revealed in March 2020 that High Speed 1 Ltd, along with SNCF and Lisea, are looking for an operator for a future London St PancrasBordeaux St Jean train service.

See also 
High Speed 2
Northern Powerhouse Rail (previously called High Speed 3)
HS4Air
High-speed rail in the United Kingdom
Megaproject
Rail transport in the United Kingdom
Shortlands railway station (dive-under at Shortlands Junction built in conjunction with HS1)
Transport in London
UK Ultraspeed
Crossings of the River Thames
Tunnels underneath the River Thames

References

Bibliography

Further reading

External links 

 
 Trade article
 Marco Polo Excite (European X-Channel Intermodal Transport Enhancement)

 
Channel Tunnel
Electric railways in the United Kingdom
Eurostar
High-speed railway lines in the United Kingdom
Main inter-regional railway lines in Great Britain
Public inquiries in the United Kingdom
Rail transport in Kent
Railway lines in South East England
Railway lines in the East of England
Railway lines in London
Railway lines opened in 2003
Railway lines opened in 2007
Standard gauge railways in England
Transport in Ashford, Kent
Transport in the London Borough of Barking and Dagenham
Transport in the London Borough of Camden
Transport in the London Borough of Hackney
Transport in the London Borough of Havering
Transport in the London Borough of Islington
Transport in the London Borough of Newham